The Alfa Romeo Vola is a concept car designed by Leonardo Fioravanti in 2000. The car was presented for the first time at the 2001 Geneva Motor Show. One of its most notable features is a rotating glass roof. The deck lid hinges are concentric with the top, so the trunk access is freely available, as the open roof sits on top of the trunk lid.  Originally livered in black with red interior, the Vola was shown at the 2005 Geneva Motor Show with a red paint and brown upholstery. The same idea was later used in the Ferrari Superamerica from 2005, also designed by Fioravanti and patented as a Revocromico roof. In 2008 the rear buttresses of the Vola were remodelled similar to the Superamerica. Fioravanti also refers to the car as the "Alfa Romeo LF."

Technical specifications

Engine: V6, 2 valves per cylinder
configuration: front transversely
displacement: 
power: 
chassis: 916 Spider-derived
transmission: front wheel drive
gearbox: 5-speed manual

References 

Vola